Megalopelte is a monotypic genus of gastropods belonging to the family Agriolimacidae. The only species is Megalopelte simrothi.

The species is found in Caucasus.

References

Agriolimacidae